Nicholas Fessenden (November 23, 1847 – December 18, 1927) was a US attorney and politician who served from 1891 to 1896 as Secretary of State of Maine.

Life 
Nicholas Fessenden was born in Saco, Maine, the son of Hewett Chandler Fessenden (1819–1885) and Mary Turner Peterson (1820–1912). He came from an influential family. His uncle was member of Congress and Senator William P. Fessenden. 

Fessenden studied at Bowdoin College and graduated from there in 1868. He interned at the law firm of John H. French and was admitted as a lawyer in 1868. He was a judge for several years at the Aroostook County court.

As a member of the Republican Party, he was from 1891 to 1896 Secretary of State of Maine.  Fessenden served in Fort Fairfield for several years as "Selectmen and overseers of poor", and also as town clerk.

Fessenden was a Freemason and belonged to the  Odd Fellows

He married Laura Emily Sterling (1852–1935). The couple had two sons. Stirling Fessenden who was also a lawyer and later chairman of the Shanghai Municipal Council and Reverend Thomas Whittemore Fessenden.  

Nicholas Fessenden died on December 18, 1927 in Fort Fairfield, Maine and was buried there.

References 

1847 births
1927 deaths
Fessenden family
People from Fort Fairfield, Maine
People from Aroostook County, Maine
Maine Republicans
Secretaries of State of Maine